Sandycombe Lodge is a Grade II* listed house at 40 Sandycoombe Road, Twickenham, in the London Borough of Richmond upon Thames. In the picturesque-cottage style, it was designed and built in 1813 by the artist J. M. W. Turner (1775–1851) as his country retreat and as a home for his father William (1745–1829). Turner lived there from 1814 to 1826. Originally known as Solus Lodge, it is the only surviving building designed by Turner, and shows the influence of his friend Sir John Soane. The appearance of the house had been much altered by the addition of second floors to the original side wings.

When it was built, Twickenham was rural, as can be seen in the engraving Sandycombe Lodge, Twickenham, Villa of J. M. W. Turner (1814) that was engraved by W. B. Cooke after William Havell and is now held at Tate Britain.

Since the sale of Sandycombe Lodge in 1826 by Turner, it has had several owners. The house was used as a factory to produce airmen's uniforms during the Second World War. The vibrations from the heavy machinery caused damage to the staircase and ceilings of the house. The house was bought by Professor Harold Livermore and his wife Ann in 1947, and they created the Sandycombe Lodge Trust (now Turner's House Trust) in 2005. After Livermore's death in 2010, the house was left to the Trust to be preserved as a monument to Turner.

Many of the house's original features survived, but it needed major restoration work and redecoration. Turner's House Trust sought to raise funds to restore the house, remove Victorian additions and return it to its appearance in Turner's day. In January 2015 it was announced that the Trust was to receive a grant of £1.4 million from the Heritage Lottery Fund to enable this work to take place. The year-long renovation, costing £2.4 million, started in March 2016. The restoration of Turner's House is now complete and the house is open to the public; visitors can experience Turner's House as he lived in it, and learn the fascinating stories behind the conservation of this important historic house.

Notes

References

Further reading
 Parry-Wingfield, Catherine; Wilton, Andrew. J. M. W. Turner, R.A.: The Artist and His House in Twickenham, Turner's House Trust, 2012, 59 pp.

External links
Turner's House official website

1813 establishments in England
Grade II* listed houses in London
Houses completed in 1813
Houses in the London Borough of Richmond upon Thames
History of Middlesex
J. M. W. Turner
Twickenham
Biographical museums in London